Robert Willis "Jack" Morey Jr. (August 23, 1936 – January 18, 2019) was an American competition rower and Olympic champion. He was born in Cleveland, Ohio. He competed at the 1956 Summer Olympics in Melbourne, where he received a gold medal in coxed eights with the American team.  He graduated from Yale University in 1958 and was a member of Skull and Bones.  He served in the United States Navy aboard the icebreaker USS Atka as a lieutenant jg. and would later earn an MBA from Harvard Business School.

References

1936 births
2019 deaths
Sportspeople from Cleveland
Olympic gold medalists for the United States in rowing
Rowers at the 1956 Summer Olympics
Yale University alumni
United States Navy officers
American male rowers
Medalists at the 1956 Summer Olympics
Harvard Business School alumni
Phillips Exeter Academy alumni